Stavre Jada (born 18 May 1998) is a Macedonia cross-country skier. Jada was the flag bearer for Macedonia during the 2018 Winter Olympics Parade of Nations.

Biathlon results
All results are sourced from the International Biathlon Union.

World Championships
0 medals

*During Olympic seasons competitions are only held for those events not included in the Olympic program.
**The single mixed relay was added as an event in 2019.

References

External links

1998 births
Living people
Cross-country skiers at the 2018 Winter Olympics
Cross-country skiers at the 2022 Winter Olympics
Macedonian male cross-country skiers
Olympic cross-country skiers of North Macedonia
Cross-country skiers at the 2016 Winter Youth Olympics